Zaragoza or Saragossa is a city in Spain.

Zaragoza may also refer to:

Places

Mexico
 Zaragoza Municipality, Coahuila
 Zaragoza, Chiapas, a locality in Ocosingo
 Ignacio Zaragoza, Chihuahua
 Ignacio Zaragoza (municipality)
 Zaragoza, Puebla
 Zaragoza, San Luis Potosí
 Zaragoza, Veracruz

Spain
 Zaragoza, Aragón
 Zaragoza (province), Aragón
 Zaragoza (Spanish Congress Electoral District)
 Zaragoza (comarca), Aragón

Other places
 Zaragoza Municipality, Antioquia, Colombia
 Zaragoza, La Libertad, El Salvador

 Zaragoza, Chimaltenango, Guatemala
 Zaragoza, Moyobamba, a neighborhood in Moyobamba, Peru
 Zaragoza, Nueva Ecija, Philippines

People with the surname
 Daniel Zaragoza (born 1957), Mexican boxing champion
 Federico Mayor Zaragoza (born 1934), Spanish scholar, politician, Head of UNESCO
 Ignacio Zaragoza (1829–1862), Mexican military commander of the 19th century
 Jessa Zaragoza (born 1979), Filipina model, singer and actress
 Steve Zaragoza (born 1982), American comedian, actor, and internet personality

Events
 Siege of Zaragoza may refer to:
 First siege of Zaragoza
 Second siege of Zaragoza

Other uses
 Mexican corvette Zaragoza, a Mexican navy ship
 Zaragoza–Delicias railway station, Spain
 Zaragoza metro station (Mexico City), Mexico
 General I. Zaragoza metro station, Monterrey, Mexico
 Real Zaragoza, a football club from Spain
 Zaragoza, a Mesoamerican obsidian source in Mexico, see obsidian use in Mesoamerica

See also
 Saragossa (disambiguation)
 Sargasso (disambiguation)